Jack Giles Sr. (November 21, 1915 – July 10, 1982) was a state senator in Alabama. He represented Madison County, Alabama. He was appointed to the Alabama Sovereignty Commission by George Wallace. He lived in Huntsville, Alabama.

References

External links
 

1915 births
1982 deaths
Alabama state senators
20th-century American politicians
Politicians from Huntsville, Alabama